The 2016 ConIFA World Football Cup was the second edition of the ConIFA World Football Cup, an international football tournament for states, minorities, stateless peoples and regions unaffiliated with FIFA organised by ConIFA. The tournament was hosted by the Football Federation of Abkhazia, with the Abkhazia team becoming the first host nation to win the tournament.

Host selection
Following the 2015 ConIFA European Football Cup, in which the teams from Abkhazia and South Ossetia were refused visas by the Hungarian government, ConIFA announced that they had delivered strong objections to what they saw as political interference. As a consequence, in July 2015, ConIFA announced that its Executive Committee had unanimously voted to award the 2016 World Football Cup to Abkhazia. It stated that, in addition to the quality of the bid, the decision would send out the message that ConIFA would stand by all of its members.

Hosts

Qualification

The 2016 World Football Cup was the first ConIFA tournament to feature qualification, as the competitors in both the previous tournament and 2015 European Football Cup were invited. The qualification process was designed around a number of different tournaments; initially, ConIFA announced that the top three teams in the 2015 EFC would gain automatic qualification for the 2016 WFC. Subsequent to this decision, ConIFA announced that it would sanction a number of friendly tournaments featuring its members as part of the qualification, with the first of these being the Niamh Challenge Cup, a four team tournament hosted by Ellan Vannin. A further tournament, the Benedikt Fontana Cup was also planned to be hosted by Raetia. The winners of these tournaments would gain qualification to the WFC.

In addition to the hosts, and the teams that gained entry to the tournament through the qualification process, ConIFA extended an invitation to the team representing the Aymara people to become the first South American side to participate.

Qualified teams

Draw
The twelve participating teams were divided into three pots of four for the group stage, which would see them drawn into four groups of three. The draw was made by ConIFA World President Per-Anders Blind in Luleå on 1 April 2016:

{| class="wikitable" style="width:98%"
|-
!width=33%|Pot 1
!width=33%|Pot 2
!width=33%|Pot 3
|-
|

|
 

|

Withdrawals
In December 2015, following advice from the UK Foreign and Commonwealth Office over security concerns regarding travel to Abkhazia, the Manx Independent Football Alliance announced that the Ellan Vannin team would withdraw from the World Football Cup, and instead take part in the 2016 Europeada Championship in Italy. Subsequently, both the Aymará team, and County of Nice also withdrew.

In March 2016, ConIFA announced that Padania had been expelled from the tournament due to procedural irregularities, to be replaced by Székely Land.

In May 2016, three weeks prior to the start of the tournament, ConIFA announced that the Romani team had been forced to withdraw from the tournament due to difficulties in obtaining travel documents for their squad. Padania, who had been expelled, were invited to take the place of the Romani team.

Matches

Group stage

Group A

Group B

Group C

Group D

Knockout stage

Quarter-finals

Semi-finals

Third-Place play-off

Final

Placement Rounds

Placement Round 1

Placement Round 2

Final Positions

References

External links

CONIFA World Football Cup
International association football competitions hosted by Georgia (country)
2016 in Georgian sport
2016 in association football
Football in Abkhazia
2016 in Abkhazia